Lake Ginninderra is an artificial lake located on the Ginninderra Creek in Canberra. It is adjacent to the Belconnen Town Centre. The lake was constructed in 1974 to collect stormwater discharge from a  catchment that includes the surrounding suburbs of Aranda, Macquarie, Cook, Bruce, Belconnen, McKellar, Giralang, Kaleen in the eastern areas of Belconnen.

The lake is home to much wildlife, such as the Black swan, moorhens, ducks and the Rakali.

The lake was formed through the construction of the Ginninderra Drive embankment across Ginninderra Creek. Water flow out of the lake is via a multi-celled concrete culvert structure and spillway chute on the Ginninderra Drive embankment.

During 2004 the Ginninderra Drive embankment was raised by one metre. The earthen embankments on the Coulter Drive side of the lake have been raised as well.

The Belconnen Arts Centre is located on its southern shore.

References

External links

Canberra Urban Parks and Places, Lake Ginninderra

Dams in the Australian Capital Territory
Reservoirs in the Australian Capital Territory
Murray-Darling basin
Buildings and structures in Canberra
Dams completed in 1974
Artificial lakes of Australia